The Parker and Weeter Block is a historic two-story building in Price, Utah. It was built in 1913 by John C. Weeter, Frank L. Parker and James W. Loofbourow. Its design has elements of Prairie School style including paired brackets and dentils at its cornice, and horizontal lines. It was acquired by Harry Mahleres and Sam Sampenos in 1938–1939, two immigrants from Greece who were brothers-in-law. It has been listed on the National Register of Historic Places since March 9, 1982.

References

National Register of Historic Places in Carbon County, Utah
Prairie School architecture in Utah
Commercial buildings completed in 1913
1913 establishments in Utah